The 1970–71 European Cup was the sixth edition of the European Cup, IIHF's premier European club ice hockey tournament. The season started on October, 1970 and finished on September 4, 1971.

The tournament was won by CSKA Moscow, who beat Dukla Jihlava in the final

First round

*  EV Landshut was disqualified after it was determined that their players Rudolf Hejtmánek and Josef Cvach were not eligible to play, having defected from communist Czechoslovakia during the Prague Spring in 1968 without having been released by their Czechoslovak teams.
 
 Brynäs IF,   
 HC La Chaux-de-Fonds  :  bye

Second round

Third round

 Dukla Jihlava,    
 CSKA Moscow  :  bye

Semifinals

Finals

References 
 Season 1971

1
IIHF European Cup